Bukkan, Mandi Bahauddin is a village in Malakwal Tehsil of Mandi Bahauddin District in Punjab, Pakistan.

Overview

Location
Bukkan is located on Sargodha-Gujrat road. It is about 25 km from Mandi Bahauddin (a drive of about 40 minutes) and about 22 kilometers from Malakwal (a drive of about 30 minutes).

Postal Code and Union Council 
The zip-code of village is 50481. The Union Council of the village is UC-66 Khai.

Main Clans and Population
The main clans are Ghega, Gondal, Rajput, Bhatti, Tarkhan, Warraich, Mughal, Shaikh Kumhar, Machi, Mochi, and Punjuthe. The total population of village is about 13,000 whereas the number of registered voters is about 13000 to 15000.

Literacy Rate 
The literacy rate of the village is very low. Most of the people are illiterate. According to a research held locally, more than 70 percent of the total population is illiterate. There are also a few schools in the village from which the well known school is Government Abbas High School Bukkan.

Land / Crops 
The village has alluvial land which is best for growing crops. Oranges, rice, wheat, and sugar cane are major crops grown there.

Villages in Mandi Bahauddin District